Svetlana Makarovič (born 1 January 1939) is a Slovenian writer of prose, poetry, children's books, and picture books, and is also an actress, illustrator and chanteuse. She has been called "The First Lady of Slovenian poetry." She is also noted for borrowing from Slovenian folklore to tell stories of rebellious and independent women. She is well-known adult and youth author. Her works for youth have become a part of modern classic and youth canon, which both hold a special place in history of the Slovenian youth literature. She won the Levstik Award for Lifetime Achievement in 2011.

Biography 
Makarovič finished secondary school for pre-school teachers in Ljubljana. In the early 1960s she began with study of various humanistic sciences (psychology, pedagogics, ethnology and foreign languages), she played piano in various cafes and for a short period she was a secretary and teacher for children with special needs. In 1968, she finished her study at Academy for Theatre, Radio, Film and Television. She was an actress in the Ljubljana city Theatre and the Slovene National Theatre. She is a freelance writer since 1970.

Works

Adult works
Makarovič started publishing her works in magazines and newspapers in 1957. Her first poem, In the Black Pavement was published in the magazine Mlada pota ("Young Paths"; 1952–1962). Other poems and magazines, in which she published, were: Naša sodobnost ("Our Contemporaneity"; 1953–1963), Tribuna ("The Tribune"; 1951–), Problemi ("Problems"; 1962, 1963), Perspektive ("Perspectives"; 1960–1964), Sodobnost ("Contemporaneity"; 1963–) and Dialog ("The Dialogue").

Her first poem collection, called Somrak ("Twilight"), was published in 1964. This one, as well as her all other works in the second half of the 1950s and early 1960s, follows the predominant path of the Slovenian lyric poetry from Intimism to Modernism. In the collection Kresna noč ("The Midsummer Night"; 1968), she expressed her personal poetics based on traditional poetic forms. Her folk poetry-based poems present a new expression of existential crisis of modern man. In the beginning of the 1970s, her poetry became more harsh in terms of form. Tragical and balad mood was the prevailing one. An example is the collection of poems Bo žrl, bo žrt ("Will Eat, will be Eaten"; 1998). Creative peaks came with her collection Srčevec ("The Heart Potion"; 1973) and the anthology Izštevanja ("Count Out"; 1977). Her poem anthology, Samost ("Aloneneness") was self-published in 2002.

In February 2012, Svetlana Makarovič published a ballad fairy tale, titled Sneguročka ("Snegurochka"), which was inspired by the Russian fairy tale character Snegurochka. Makarovič has had great passion for Russian tradition since childhood.

Youth poetry 
Makarovič started releasing her youth works after 1970. In her prose works, she developed her own individual style, which is known for its original naming of characters: Zofka the Witch, Emily the Hen, Mishmash the Baker and others. These characters have premeditated character with archetypical motive of leaving home, hurt child, orphan child.

Svetlana Makarovič writes predominantly modern animal stories (picture books Pekarna Mišmaš ("The Mishmash Bakery"; 1974) and Sapramiška ("Skipmouse"; 1976), collections Take živalske ("Such Animal Ones"; 1973), Mačja preja ("Cat Yarn"; 1992) and Veveriček posebne sorte ("A Special Kind of Squirrel"; 1994)), with primarily myth-based main characters, as well as fantastic fiction (Haramija; 2005). The protagonists are animals, living in a special world and who have similar characteristics as human (they talk and act like them). The reality in the stories is not idealised. It includes cruel, selfish, envious people; gossips, grown-ups who limit children's playfulness – the reasons why these animals go through moments of loneliness, despair and sadness. Noticeable innovation of her works are taboos (e.g. sex and elimination) Škrat Kuzma dobi nagrado ("Kuzma the Gremlin Wins a Prize"; 1974) and Coprnica Zofka (1989) are regarded as stories with primarily myth-based main characters. Her stories point out, in its very core, non-understanding and non-acceptance of difference. Representative fantastic stories are Kosovirja na leteči žlici ("Cosies on the Flying Spoon"; 1974), Kam pa kam kosovirja? ("Where to, Oh, Where to, Cosies?"; 1975) and Mi, kosovirji ("We, Cosies"; 2009). The storyteller is taking the side of free being and opposes rules and demands of authorities. Some of her works were tape recorded (Pekarna Mišmaš (1976), Sapramiška (1986), Čuk na palici ("A Screech Owl on a Stick"; 1988), Mali kakadu ("The Little Cockatoo"; 1989), Sovica Oka ("Big-Eyes the Little Owl"; 1992) and others).

Curriculum for Slovenian language at schools 
Her works have been recommended in Curriculum for Slovene language (2011): Jaz sem jež ("I'm a Hedgehog"), Čuk na palici, Pismo ("A Letter"), Sovica Oka, Papagaj in sir ("The Parrot and the Cheese"), Zajček gre na luno ("The Bunny Goes to the Moon"), Razvajeni vrabček ("Spoilt Little Sparrow"), Pod medvedovim dežnikom ("Under the Bear's Umbrella"), Jazbec in ovčka ("The Badger and the Sheep"), Prašičkov koncert ("The Pig Concert"), Pekarna Mišmaš, Coprnica Zofka, Kosovirja na leteči žlici, Miška spi ("The Mouse Sleeps"), Volk in sedem kozličkov ("The Wolf and the Seven Little Goats"), Kam pa kam, kosovirja, Jutro ("The Morning").

Music participation 
She has published some books of chansons, e.g. Krizantema na klavirju ("Chrysanthemum on Piano"; 1990), and has performed her own works on musical recitals before invitation-only audiences. The subjects of her chansons are very like those of her poems - the lyrics address the fields of modern family upbringing, social habits, moral norms and social conventions. A difference is that in her chansons there is more humor.

She has recorded albums of her interpretations of her own chansons: Nočni šanson ("Night chanson" - 1984); Dajdamski  portreti ("Dajdamski Portraits" - 1985); Pelin žena ("Poison Woman" - 1985, with Dennis González); Namesto rož ("Instead of Flowers" - 1999).

She also wrote lyrics for some standards: Mesto mladih , Na na na (Neca Falk), V Ljubljano (Marjana Deržaj) and an intro song for the movie Sreča na vrvici (Marjeta Ramšak).

Cooperation with the Ljubljana Puppet Theatre 
Her work named Sovica Oka was introduced in 1972 on the stage of Ljubljana Puppet Theatre.  Sapramiška is a puppet show which was played most times. It was first performed on 17 October 1986. Svetlana Makarovič cooperated with LGL in many ways – she wrote and put music to lyrics; wrote and adapted text, made the designs for puppets and sets; she even performed sometimes. She played a part in 31 shows; she was a host in Italy, Austria, Mexico, Australia, and Croatia.

Selection of stage acts from Svetlana Makarovič 
Sovica Oka, 1972 (author and adaptation) (Oka the Owl)
Hiša tete Barbare, 1975 (author) (The Aunt Barbara's House)
Pekarna Mišmaš, 1977 (author, text adaptation) (The Mishmash Bakery)
Igra o letu, 1983 (author) (The Flying Game)
Mačja prodajalna, 1984 (author, music, role) (Cat Store)
Mrtvec pride po ljubico, 1986 (author) (Dead Man Comes for his Mistress)
Sapramiška, 1986 (author, roles /Sapramiška, Regica, aunt Grizelda/, music) (Skipmouse)
Mi, kosovirji, 1988 (author, text adaptation) (We, the Cosies)
Korenčkov Palček, 1989 (author, roles /Sapramiška, Kukavec, Regica, Belouška Jarmila/, music, puppet design) (The Carrot Dwarf)
Gal med lutkami, 1992 (author, music, puppet design) (Gal among Puppets)
Medena pravljica, 1994 (direction, author, vloge /Sapramiška, Regica, Zajček/, glasba, likovna zasnova lutk, likovna zasnova scen) (Honey Fairytale)
Jólakötturinn, 1997 (direction, translation and adaptation of text, song texts, adaptation of Iceland music motifs, music performance, roles) (Jartruda, Mačkursson, Gryla)
Kokoška Emilija, 1997 (direction, author, role /kokoška Kika/, music, music arrangement) (Emily the Hen)
Tacamuca, 1998 (author, music) (Pussypaws)

Criticism of Slovenian society 
Svetlana Makarovič quit the Slovene Writers' Association, because she disagreed with the standards for allocation of membership. She believed that the main criterion should be quality, not quantity. She defied official publishers, claiming they only exploit authors. Besides that, she strived for social rights of freelance artists. She stood up for the founding of a new, opened to pluralism and only-literature dedicated magazine (1980), but did not cooperate with Nova revija, which started to come out in 1982. Current political and ideological issues supposedly pushed out the art. She forbade publishing of her works in any anthologies or school books, based on her belief that her black and deathlike poetry would be a big reason that young people hate literature. She regards her works not as national goods but as a protected author property. She opposes communist saying that art is for all people. She declined her placement in the Anthology of Slovenian female writers, because the criterion was gender and not quality.

She expresses her criticism of her social environment through columns. In 2000, she declined the public reception of the Prešeren Award.

Slovenceljni 
Makarovič perceives image of Slovenes as cold-hearted, primitive, hypocritical and servile. She contemptuously calls them  Slovenceljni. In her satirical poems Pesmi o Sloveniji za tuje in domače goste ("Poems about Slovenia for Domestic and Foreign Guests"; 1984), she disintegrated mythicised self-image of Slovenes using quite witty irony. She portrayed them as narcissistic, primitive, aggressive on the inside, naive on the outside through travesty of popular tale of Martin Krpan and through allusion on Holy Bible. She mocked the same image in her chansons, collected in Krizantema na klavirju (1990)

Anti-Catholic stance
In January 2012, Svetlana Makarović caused a controversy with her statement: "In my opinion the Catholic Church in Slovenia is something one must hate. I feel it as my civic duty." The statement was part of an interview published by the Planet Siol.net web portal.

The Council of Lay Catholics of Slovenia designated the statement "crooked, primitive and unacceptable", and in contradiction with the Constitution of Slovenia. The office of the Human Rights Ombudsman in Slovenia as well as the Slovenian police have received several initiatives for intervention. The office did not take a stance in this particular case, but has denounced all forms of publicly expressed hatred and intolerance pointed towards individuals and individual groups due to their personal circumstances. Zdenka Čebašek Travnik, the ombudsman, explained: "For me as a person and the human rights ombdusman, it is unacceptable that the artist used her gift in such a harsh way, which hurts and wounds people." Nataša Pirc Musar, the Information Commissioner of the Republic of Slovenia, did not study the case as it was out of her jurisdiction, but condemned the statement. Aleš Gulič, the director of the Office for Religious Communities, explained that he does not see the statement as a call to lynch and added: "It's not nice what the poet said, but actually, she was just angered due to the acts that are really controversial, and due to the concealement of these acts. From her statements, I've only read her personal stance towards the Catholic Church as an institution."

Bibliography

Adult poetry
Somrak, Cankarjeva založba, 1964  (Twilight)
Kresna noč, DZS, 1968  (Midsummer night)
Volčje jagode, Obzorja, 1972  (Wolfberries)
Srčevec, Cankarjeva založba 1973 
Pelin žena, Mladinska knjiga, 1974  (Poison Woman)
Vojskin čas (pesniški list), Založništvo Tržaškega tiska, 1974  (Time of the Army)
Izštevanja, Cankarjeva založba, 1977  (Count out)
Pesmi (besedila sodobnih jugoslovanskih pisateljev / Svetlana Makarovič, Niko Grafenauer, Tomaž Šalamun), Mladinska knjiga, 1979  (Poems)
Sosed gora, Obzorja, 1980   (Neighbour mountain)
Pesmi o Sloveniji za tuje in domače goste, Lutkovno gledališče, 1984  (Poems of Slovenia for foreign and domestic guests)
Svetlana Makarovič, France Mihelič – Pesmi Svetlane Makarovič in Risbe Franceta Miheliča, Cankarjeva založba, 1987 
Krizantema na klavirju. Šansonska besedila Svetlane Makarovič, Printing, 1990  (Chrysanthemum on piano)
Tisti čas, Mladika, 1993  (That time)
Bo žrl, bo žrt (izbrane pesmi), Mladinska knjiga 1998  (Will eat, will be eaten)
Samost, samozaložba, 2002  (Aloneness)

Adult prose 
 Prekleti kadilci, Center za slovensko književnost, 2001  (Damn smokers)
 S krempljem podčrtano, Center za slovensko književnost, 2005  (Underlined with a claw)
 Saga o Hallgerd, Arsem, 2010  (The Hallger Saga)

Youth literature
Maček Titi, Samozaložba, 1980  (Titi the Cat)
Gal v galeriji, Mladinska knjiga, 1981  (Gal in the gallery)
Dedek mraz že gre, Lutkovno gledališče, 1982  (Dedek Mraz is coming)
Krokodilovo kosilo: pesnitev – grozovitev, samozaložba, 1983  (Crocodile lunch: poem – dreadness)
Čuk na palici, Delavska enotnost, 1986  (Owl on the stick)
Črni muc, kaj delaš?, Dokumentarna, 1987  (Black cat, what are you doing?)
Kaj bi miška rada?, Dokumentarna, 1987  (What would a mouse want?)
Poprtnjački, Dokumentarna, 1988  (Clothers)
Kaj lepega povej, DZS, 1993  (Tell me something nice)
Show strahov: pesnitev grozovitev, DZS, 1995  (The fear show: poem – dreadness)
Veliki kosovirski koncert, Lutkovno gledališče, 2001  (The grand kosovirian concert)
Strahec v galeriji, Narodna galerija, 2003  (Spook in the gallery)
Mačnice, Center za slovensko književnost, 2006  (Catters)
Coprniški muc: pesnitev coprnitev, Miš, 2008  (Witchy Cat: poem of witcherness)

Prose and poetry works 
Kosovirja na leteči žlici, Mladinska knjiga, 1974  (Kosovirs and flying spoon)
Kam pa kam, kosovirja?, DZS, 1975  (Where to, Kosovirs?)
Mačje leto, Dokumentarna, 1987  (Year of the Cat)
Zajčkovo leto, Državna založba Slovenije, 1993  (Year of the bunny)
Mi, kosovirji, Miš, 2009  (We, the Kosovirs)

Storytelling for youth 
Fairy tale collections
 Miška spi, Mladinska knjiga, 1972  (Sleepin Mouse)
 Take živalske, Borec, 1973  (Those Beastlies)
 Vrček se razbije, Mladinska knjiga, 1975  (Jug Is Broken)
 Glavni petelinček, Mladinska knjiga, 1976  (The Chief Rooster)
 Vrtirepov koledar: 1977, Partizanska knjiga, 1976  (Tailwhippers Calendar)
 Pravljice iz mačje preje, Borec, 1980  (Cat Yarn Fairytales)
 Mačja preja, Mladika, 1992  (Cat yarn)
 Smetiščni muc in druge zgodbe, Mladinska knjiga, 1999  (Scruffycat and Other Stories)
 Svetlanine pravljice = Svetlana's fairytales, Miš, 2008  (Svetlana's Fairytales)

 Author translations and adaptions Picko in Packo, translation of Wilhelm Busch picture book Max und Moritz, Založništvo tržaškega tiska, 1980 Maček Mačkursson, translation of works of Jólakötturinn Hallveig Thorlacius, Mladinska knjiga, 1997 Strahopetko, translation of Fünfter sein Ernst Jandl, Mladinska knjiga, Ljubljana, 1999 

 Discography 

Albums
 Nočni šanson (1984)
 Dajdamski portreti (1985)
 Pelin žena (with Dennis González) (1986) 
 Namesto rož'' (1999)

Awards

Recognition awards 
 2011: Freewoman of Ljubljana

Awards
 1968: Yugoslavian award Sterijino pozorje in Novi Sad
 1975: Levstik Award (for pesniški list Vojskin čas)
 1975: Yugoslavian award Zmajeve dječje igre
 1976: Prešeren Fund Award (for the poem collection "War Time")
 1987: Janusz Korczak Honour List
 1994: Jenko Award
 1994: IBBY Honour List
 1998, 2000, 2002: nomination for Andersen Award
 2000: Prešeren Award
 2002: viktor for life's work
 2009: Golden Order for Merits of the Republic of Slovenia
 2011: Levstik Award (for life's work)
 2012: Golden Coin of Poetry
2021: Ježek Award

References

External links

 Alojz Ihan, intervju: Svetlana Makarovič, Sodobnost (1963–), 1996, letnik 44, številka 5
 
 
 
 Vest, Denis pokora – Pogovor s pisateljico in pesnico Svetlano Makarovič, 2009

Slovenian women poets
Slovenian poets
Living people
1939 births
Writers from Maribor
Yugoslav women singers
Prešeren Award laureates
Slovenian children's writers
Slovenian stage actresses
Levstik Award laureates
Slovenian illustrators
University of Ljubljana alumni
Slovenian women artists
Slovenian women illustrators
Slovenian children's book illustrators
Slovenian women children's writers
Actors from Maribor